These are the statistics of the 2011 Japanese Regional Leagues.

Champions list

League standings

Hokkaidō
2011 was the 34th season of Hokkaido League. 
The season started May 15 and ended October 9.
It was contested by eight teams and Club Fields Norbritz Hokkaidō won the tournament and qualified for the All-Japan Regional Promotion Series.
Iwamizawa Hokushūkai, Komazawa OB, & Tokachi Fairsky Genesis were promoted from the Hokkaido Block Leagues

Sapporo FC official name is Sapporo Shūkyūdan.

After the season was over, Blackpecker Hakodate & Iwamizawa were relegated to the Block leagues.

Tōhoku

Division 1

Division 2

Kanto

Division 1

Division 2

Hokushin-etsu

Division 1

Division 2

Tokai

Division 1

Division 2

Kansai

Division 1

Division 2

Chūgoku

Shikoku

Kyūshū

2011
4